This is a list of Polish noble families with the title of Marquess.

Bibliography
 Szymon Konarski, Armorial de la noblesse titrèe polonaise, Paris 1958
 Tomasz Lenczewski, Genealogie rodów utytułowanych w Polsce, t. I, Warszawa 1997.

See also

 List of szlachta
 List of Polish titled nobility
 Magnates of Poland and Lithuania